Deringulla is a location in north-western New South Wales, Australia.

Deringulla is on the Castlereagh River.

A railway station on the now closed Gwabegar railway line was located there between 1917 and 1974.

References

Localities in New South Wales